Photokeratitis or ultraviolet keratitis is a painful eye condition caused by exposure of insufficiently protected eyes to the ultraviolet (UV) rays from either natural (e.g. intense sunlight) or artificial (e.g. the electric arc during welding) sources. Photokeratitis is akin to a sunburn of the cornea and conjunctiva. 

The injury may be prevented by wearing eye protection that blocks most of the ultraviolet radiation, such as welding goggles with the proper filters, a welder's helmet, sunglasses rated for sufficient UV protection, or appropriate snow goggles. The condition is usually managed by removal from the source of ultraviolet radiation, covering the corneas, and administration of pain relief. Photokeratitis is known by a number of different terms including: snow blindness, arc eye, welder's flash, bake eyes, corneal flash burns, flash burns, niphablepsia, or keratoconjunctivitis photoelectrica.

Signs and symptoms 
Common symptoms include pain, intense tears, eyelid twitching, discomfort from bright light, and constricted pupils.

Cause 
Any intense exposure to UV light can lead to photokeratitis. In 2010, the Department of Optometry at the Dublin Institute of Technology published that the threshold for photokeratitis is 0.12 J/m2. (Prior to this, in 1975, the Division of Biological Effects at the US Bureau of Radiological Health had published that the human threshold for photokeratitis is 50 J/m2.) Common causes include welding with failure to use adequate eye protection such as an appropriate welding helmet or welding goggles. This is termed arc eye, while photokeratitis caused by exposure to sunlight reflected from ice and snow, particularly at elevation, is commonly called snow blindness. It can also occur due to using tanning beds without proper eyewear. Natural sources include bright sunlight reflected from snow or ice or, less commonly, from sea or sand. Fresh snow reflects about 80% of the UV radiation compared to a dry, sandy beach (15%) or sea foam (25%). This is especially a problem in polar regions and at high altitudes, as with about every  of elevation (above sea level), the intensity of UV rays increases by four percent.

Diagnosis 
Fluorescein dye staining will reveal damage to the cornea under ultraviolet light.

Prevention 

Photokeratitis can be prevented by using sunglasses or eye protection that transmits 5–10% of visible light and absorbs almost all UV rays. Additionally, these glasses should have large lenses and side shields to avoid incidental light exposure. Sunglasses should always be worn, even when the sky is overcast, as UV rays can pass through clouds.

The Inuit, Yupik, and other Arctic peoples carved snow goggles from materials such as driftwood or caribou antlers to help prevent snow blindness.  Curved to fit the user's face with a large groove cut in the back to allow for the nose, the goggles allowed in a small amount of light through a long thin slit cut along their length.  The goggles were held to the head by a cord made of caribou sinew.

In the event of missing sunglass lenses, emergency lenses can be made by cutting slits in dark fabric or tape folded back onto itself. The SAS Survival Guide recommends blackening the skin underneath the eyes with charcoal (as the ancient Egyptians did) to avoid any further reflection.

Treatment 
The pain may be temporarily alleviated with anaesthetic eye drops for the examination; however, they are not used for continued treatment, as anaesthesia of the eye interferes with corneal healing, and may lead to corneal ulceration and even loss of the eye. Cool, wet compresses over the eyes and artificial tears may help local symptoms when the feeling returns. Nonsteroidal anti-inflammatory drug (NSAID) eyedrops are widely used to lessen inflammation and eye pain, but have not been proven in rigorous trials. Systemic (oral) pain medication is given if discomfort is severe. Healing is usually rapid (24–72 hours) if the injury source is removed. Further injury should be avoided by isolation in a dark room, removing contact lenses, not rubbing the eyes, and wearing sunglasses until the symptoms improve.

See also 

 Actinic conjunctivitis
 Albedo
 Eye black
 Glare (vision)
 Health effects of sun exposure
 Over-illumination
 Photic retinopathy
 Selective yellow

References

External links 

Blindness
Mountaineering and health
Disorders of sclera and cornea
Welding safety
Hazards of outdoor recreation

bg:Снежна слепота
de:Schneeblindheit
it:Cecità da neve
no:Snøblindhet
pl:Ślepota śnieżna
ru:Офтальмия
fi:Lumisokeus
sv:Snöblindhet
tr:Kar körlüğü
zh:雪盲症